Ebony Woman is an album by soul singer Billy Paul. The album was produced by Kenny Gamble and Leon Huff, arranged by Stanley Johnson and Bobby Martin, and engineered by Joe Tarsia. On its original Neptune Records release in 1970 the LP reached #12 on the Billboard soul charts and #183 on the pop charts. The Bobby Martin penned "Let's Fall in Love All Over" was released as a single but failed to chart. The album was re-released with new cover art in 1973 on Philadelphia International Records reaching #186 on the pop chart and #43 on the soul charts. Big Break Records remastered the album for its 2012 re-release on CD.

Release and critical reaction

Billy Paul originally recorded the song "Ebony Woman" in 1959 and it was released as a single on the New Dawn label. The song was resurrected and re-cut as the title track for an album which Paul and his producers Kenny Gamble and Leon Huff wanted to make a statement with. Specifically, Paul's debut Feelin' Good at the Cadillac Club was a conventional jazz album with sparse production that failed to make the impact they hoped it would. Paul recalled the shift in direction: "We decided to do something with a more up-to-date sound, with more musicians. Something that would venture a bit into R&B but without me losing my sound. We spent a lot of time workin it out and came up with the album called Ebony Woman, which came out on Neptune." Paul mixed jazz and soul; ballads with mid-tempo and upbeat numbers; and covers with originals—a formula he would repeat on subsequent albums. The album's modest chart success was buoyed by its considerable appeal in Detroit, home of Motown.

Ed Williams, Program Director for WLIB in New York City, wrote the liner notes that appear on the back cover of the album:

Author John A. Jackson explained how the album's struggles were necessarily tied to the fortunes, or lack thereof, of Gamble & Huff's independent record label Neptune Records: 

Specifically, Neptune was distributed by Chess Records and when owner Leonard Chess died, Neptune was forced to close shop.

But Paul continued to record for Gamble & Huff's new label Philadelphia International Records and following the massive success of "Me and Mrs. Jones" and the 360 Degrees of Billy Paul album, Gamble & Huff decided to reissue Paul's first two albums. When asked in 1973 about a follow-up to 360 Degrees, Paul replied:

Allmusic's Ron Wynn called the album "good, though uneven" giving it two out of five stars.

Chris Wells also gave the album two of five stars noting that the title track for the album is "by far its best track – a gorgeous, superbly sung ballad, a paean to the African-American female in a time of civil rights and social and political consciousness. Unfortunately a lot of the rest isn’t up to much. Basically, it’s covers all the way...Paul investing lots of effort to no great purpose. True, Billy’s own contributions reveal him to be a singer of character and individuality, albeit one in need of some strong material to call his own."

On the album's 2012 reissue, Joe Marchese of The Second Disc called it a "must-have reissue.... an album that’s most worthy of reassessment and reissue especially during this, PIR’s 40th anniversary year."

Track listing
Side 1
"Ebony Woman" - (Morris Bailey)  3:52
"Mrs. Robinson" - (Paul Simon)  4:31
"Windmills of Your Mind" - (Alan and Marilyn Bergman, Michel Legrand)  8:00
"Everyday People" - (Sylvester Stuart)  3:55

Side 2
"Let's Fall in Love All Over" - (Robert Martin)  3:51
"Windy" - (Ruthann Friedman)  2:50
"Psychedelic Sally" - (Horace Silver)  2:58
"Traces" - (Buddy Buie, J. R. Cobb, Emory Gordy, Jr.)  4:01
"Proud Mary" - (John Fogerty)  2:23

Personnel
Billy Paul - lead and backing vocals
Stanley Johnson - piano, arrangements
Sherman Ferguson - percussion
James Glenn - bass
Bobby Martin - arrangements on "Ebony Woman" and "Let's Fall in Love All Over"
Technical
Joe Tarsia - engineer
Dick Fowler - album design
Mastered at Frankford/Wayne Recording Labs
Distributed by Chess Records, Chicago, ILL., 60616 - A Division of GRT Corporation
Ed Lee, Hiroshi Morishima - design (1973 PIR Reissue)
Don Hunstein - photography (1973 PIR Reissue)
Nick Robbins - remastering from 1st generation tapes at Sound Mastering in London for BBR 2012 reissue

Charts

References

External links
 Billy Paul-Ebony Woman at Allmusic
 Billy Paul-Ebony Woman at Discogs
Billy Paul-Ebony Woman at Dereks Music Blog

1970 albums
1973 albums
Billy Paul albums
Albums produced by Kenneth Gamble
Albums produced by Leon Huff
Albums arranged by Bobby Martin
Albums recorded at Sigma Sound Studios
Philadelphia International Records albums